This is the discography for the Swedish metal band Katatonia.

Albums

Studio albums

Remix albums

Live albums

Compilation albums

Demos

Split albums

EPs

Singles

Music videos 
 "Deliberation" (2006)
 "My Twin" (2006)
 "July" (2007)
 "Day and Then the Shade" (2009)
 "The Longest Year" (2010)
 "Lethean" (2013)
 "Shifts" (2016)
 "Behind the Blood" (2020)
 "The Winter of Our Passing" (2020)
 "Atrium" (2022)
 "Austerity" (2022)
 "Birds" (2023)
 "Opaline" (2023)

References

Discographies of Swedish artists
Heavy metal group discographies